Silence Studio is a Swedish recording studio in the small town of Koppom, owned by recording-technician/producer Anders Lind. The studio has been the location of many recordings of Swedish and Norwegian artists. This is an incomplete list of examples.

Atomic Swing
Beranek
Bergman Rock
Bob Hund
Bobbysocks
Camouflage
The Creeps
Charta 77
Cloudberry Jam
Chateau Neuf Spelemän
Dag Vag
Dia Psalma
Dom Lyckliga Kompisarna
Dronning Mauds Land
Eldkvarn
Ebba Grön
Fläskkvartetten
Figurines
Finn Kalvik
Fint Tillsammans
Fidget
First Floor Power
Green
Grisen Skriker
Hassangänget
Hardy Nilsson
Hedningarna
Hell on Wheels
Hellacopters
Jannicke
Kent
Kai Martin & Stick!
Lars Hug
Langsomt Mot Nord
Loosegoats
Matchstick Sun
Monroes
Nina Persson & Niklas Frisk
Nikolaj Nørlund
Olle Ljungström
Per Cussion
Popsicle
Return
Reperbahn
Robert Broberg
Scatterbrain
Stefan Sundström
Sigge Hills
Sophie Zelmani
Speaker
Svenne Rubins
Stillborn
Thomas Di Leva
Trond Granlund
Joakim Thåström
Traste Lindéns Kvintett
Toms Tivoli
Union Carbide Productions
Urban Turban
Urga
Wannadies
Whipped Cream
Wild Rovers

References 

 Silence Studio home-page

Recording studios in Sweden